The 1940 NFL season was the 21st regular season of the National Football League. The season ended when the Chicago Bears defeated the Washington Redskins in the NFL Championship Game by 73–0; this result still stands as the most one-sided victory (and highest score) in NFL history as of the 2022-2023 season.

The Pittsburgh Pirates were rebranded as the Steelers before the 1940 season.

Draft
The 1940 NFL Draft was held on December 9, 1939 at Milwaukee's Schroeder Hotel. With the first pick, the Chicago Cardinals selected halfback George Cafego from the University of Tennessee.

Major rule changes
The penalty for a forward pass not from scrimmage is 5 yards.
Penalties for fouls that occur prior to a pass or kick from behind the line of scrimmage are enforced from the previous spot. However, penalties for fouls during a free ball or when the offensive team fouls behind their line are enforced from the spot of the foul.
Fouls enforced in the field of play cannot penalize the ball more than half the distance to the offender's goal line.
If the offensive team commits pass interference in their opponent's end zone, the defense has the choice of 15 yards from the previous spot and a loss of down, or a touchback.

Final standings

NFL Championship Game

Chi. Bears 73, Washington 0, at Griffith Stadium, Washington, D.C., December 8, 1940

League leaders

Awards

Coaching changes
Brooklyn Dodgers: Potsy Clark was replaced by Jock Sutherland.
Chicago Cardinals: Ernie Nevers was replaced by Jimmy Conzelman.
Detroit Lions: Gus Henderson was replaced by George Clark.

Stadium changes
 The Detroit Lions played full time at University of Detroit Stadium, no longer splitting home games with Briggs Stadium
 The Philadelphia Eagles moved from Philadelphia Municipal Stadium to Shibe Park

References
 NFL Record and Fact Book
 NFL History 1931–1940 (Last accessed December 4, 2005)
 Total Football: The Official Encyclopedia of the National Football League

National Football League seasons